Buići   is a village in Croatia. 

Populated places in Istria County